The 2013–14 University of North Dakota men's basketball team represented the University of North Dakota during the 2013–14 NCAA Division I men's basketball season. They are led by eighth year head coach Brian Jones and played their home games at the Betty Engelstad Sioux Center. They were members of the Big Sky Conference. They finished the season 17–17, 12–8 in Big Sky play to finish in a three-way tie for second place. They advanced to the championship game of the Big Sky Conference tournament where they lost to Weber State. They were invited to the CollegeIndiser.com Tournament for the fourth straight year. In the CIT, they lost in the first round to Nebraska–Omaha.

Roster

Schedule

|-
!colspan=9 style="background:#009E60; color:#000000;"| Regular season

|-
!colspan=9 style="background:#009E60; color:#000000;"| Big Sky tournament

|-
!colspan=9 style="background:#009E60; color:#000000;"| CIT

References

North Dakota Fighting Hawks men's basketball seasons
North Dakota
North Dakota
Fight
Fight